Boguszyce  is a village in the administrative district of Gmina Wierzbinek, within Konin County, Greater Poland Voivodeship, in west-central Poland.

References

Boguszyce
Brześć Kujawski Voivodeship
Warsaw Governorate
Warsaw Voivodeship (1919–1939)
Pomeranian Voivodeship (1919–1939)